Thubana exoema is a moth in the family Lecithoceridae. It was described by Edward Meyrick in 1911. It is found in Sri Lanka.

The wingspan is 13–17 mm. The forewings are dark purplish-fuscous with a pale whitish-ochreous cloudy rather irregular streak crossing the wing before the middle and small whitish-ochreous costal and dorsal spots at four-fifths. The hindwings are pale grey, darker posteriorly.

References

Moths described in 1911
Thubana